[[File:Elphinstone tower 190609 - 01.jpg|thumb|right|Elphinstone Tower, near Airth]]Alexander Elphinstone, 2nd Lord Elphinstone''' (1511-1547) was a Scottish landowner.

Alexander Elphinstone was the son of Alexander Elphinstone, 1st Lord Elphinstone, and Elizabeth Barlow, an English  gentlewoman in the household of Margaret Tudor.

Alexander became Lord Elphinstone after the death of his father at the Battle of Flodden in September 1513.

Lord Elphinstone died from wounds received at the Battle of Pinkie in September 1547.

Family
Alexander Elphinstone married Katharine Erskine, daughter of John Erskine, 5th Lord Erskine, by his wife Lady Margaret Campbell, daughter of Archibald Campbell, 2nd Earl of Argyll and Elizabeth Stewart. Their children included;
 Robert Elphinstone, 3rd Lord Elphinstone
 Michael Elphinstone (1544-1625), Master of Household to James VI of Scotland
 Elizabeth Elphinstone, who married David Somerville of Plean Castle
 Isobel Elphinstone, who married John Hamilton of Haggs.
 Margaret Elphinstone, who married John Livingstone younger of Dunipace.
 Margery Elphinstone, who married Robert Drummond of Carnock.

References

1511 births
1547 deaths
Scottish deaths at the Battle of Pinkie
Alexander
2
16th-century Scottish people